A  or skull rack was a type of wooden rack or palisade documented in several Mesoamerican civilizations, which was used for the public display of human skulls, typically those of war captives or other sacrificial victims. It is a scaffold-like construction of poles on which heads and skulls were placed after holes had been made in them. Many have been documented throughout Mesoamerica, and range from the Epiclassic through early Post-Classic. In 2017 archeologists announced the discovery of the Hueyi Tzompantli, with more than 650 skulls, in the archeological zone of the Templo Mayor in Mexico City.

Etymology
The name comes from the Classical Nahuatl language of the Aztecs but is also commonly applied to similar structures depicted in other civilizations. Its precise etymology is uncertain although its general interpretation is 'skull rack', 'wall of skulls', or 'skull banner'. That derivation has been ascribed to explain the depictions in several codices that associate these with banners; however, Nahuatl linguist Frances Karttunen has proposed that  means merely 'row' or 'wall'.

Historical distribution

General information
It was most commonly erected as a linearly-arranged series of vertical posts connected by a series of horizontal crossbeams. The skulls were pierced or threaded laterally along these horizontal stakes. An alternate arrangement, more common in the Maya regions, was for the skulls to be impaled on top of one another along the vertical posts.

 are known chiefly from their depiction in Late Postclassic (13th to 16th centuries) and post-Conquest (mid-16th to 17th centuries) codices, contemporary accounts of the conquistadores, and several other inscriptions. However, a -like structure, thought to be the first instance of such structures, has been excavated from the Proto-Classic Zapotec civilization at the La Coyotera, Oaxaca site, dated from around the 2nd century BCE to the 3rd century CE.

 are also noted in other Mesoamerican pre-Columbian cultures, such as the Toltec and Mixtec.

Toltec
At the Toltec capital of Tula exists the first indications in Central Mexico of a real fascination with skulls and skeletons. Tula flourished from the ninth until the thirteenth century. The  at Tula displayed multiple rows of stone carved skulls adorning the sides of a broad platform upon which the actual skulls of sacrificial victims were exhibited. The  appeared during the final phases of civilization at Tula, which was destroyed around 1200.

Maya
Other examples are indicated from Maya civilization sites such as Uxmal and other Puuc region sites of the Yucatán, dating from around the late 9th-century decline of the Maya Classical Era. A particularly fine and intact inscription example survives at the extensive Chichen Itza site.

Aztec era
There were at least five more skull racks in Tenochtitlan but by all accounts they were much smaller.

This  is depicted in the twelfth book of the Florentine Codex. This taunting is also depicted in an Aztec codex which relates the story, and the subsequent battles which led to the eventual capture of the city by the Spanish forces and their allies.

During the stay of Cortes's expedition in the Aztec capital Tenochtitlan (initially as guest-captives of the Emperor Moctezuma II, before the battle which would lead to the conquest), they reported a wooden  altar adorned with the skulls from recent sacrifices. Within the complex of the Templo Mayor itself, a relief in stucco depicted these sacrifices; the remains of this relief have survived and may now be seen in the ruins in the Zócalo of present-day Mexico City.

Preparation of  
Excavations at Templo Mayor in the Aztec capital Tenochtitlan have revealed many skulls belonging to women and children, in addition to those of men, a demonstration of the diversity of the human sacrifices in Aztec culture.  After displaying severed heads, many scholars have determined that limbs of Aztec victims would be cannibalized  Fray Diego Durán confirms this, stating that skulls were delivered to temples after "the flesh had been eaten".

Regarding this, Durán states

When [the skulls] become old and deteriorated, they fell in pieces. When the palisade become old, however, it was renovated, and on its removal many [skulls] broke. Others were removed to make room for more, so that there would be a place for those were to be killed later
Archeologist Eduardo Contreras believes that the tissue attached to skulls was removed prior to a  pole being inserted through the side of the skulls. He bases these assumptions off of excavations of the Plaza de las Tres Culturas at Tlatelolco, Mexico City between 1960 and 1965.

The  was the central  found in Tenochtitlan. The skull rack here served as a reminder of the Aztec's ongoing Flowery Wars. An important aspect of Aztec warfare was the capture of enemy warriors to serve as sacrificial victims, which is evident from the number of warriors found sacrificed around Aztec structures. The  consisted of a massive masonry platform composed of “thirty long steps” measuring fully 60 meters in length by 30 meters wide at its summit. Atop of the aforementioned platform was erected an equally formidable wooden palisade and scaffolding consisting of between 60 and 70 massive uprights or timbers woven together with an impressive constellation of horizontal cross beams upon which were suspended the tens of thousands of decapitated human heads once impaled thereon. Regarding this, Bernal Díaz de Castillo states:

Various scholarly interpretations of the cosmological importance of 's placement have emerged. Eduardo Matos Moctezuma claims that a central  was placed north of the Templo Mayor. Moctezuma notes that no corresponding shrine was found south. Moctezuma also notes that Mexica views of the universe, which divide the universe into a horizontal and vertical plane, claim that the northern sector of the horizontal plane corresponds to Mictlampa, or the land of the dead.

Modern archeological evidence has found that this large palisade was flanked by two circular towers made out of skulls and mortar.

Historical depictions 

The Frontispiece of the Codex Mendoza depicts a  holding single skull next to an eagle perched on a cactus. Folio 45v of the Codex Borgia depicts a platform adorned with skulls.

Recent excavations 
These excavations took place near the Mexico City Metropolitan Cathedral and included the finding of one  tower. These excavations have revealed that women and children were sacrificed, although men made up 75% of the sacrificial victims.

Association and meaning
Apart from their use to display the skulls of ritualistically-executed war captives,  often occur in the contexts of Mesoamerican ball courts, which were widespread throughout the region's civilizations and sites. The game was 'played for keeps' ending with the losing team being sacrificed. Not all games resulted in this outcome, however, and for those that did it is surmised that these participants were often notable captives. An alternative theory is that it was the captain of the winning team who lost his head, but there is little evidence that this was the case. Still, it is acknowledged that in Mesoamerican culture to be sacrificed was to be honored with feeding the gods. Tula, the former Toltec capital, has a well-preserved  inscription on its ball court.

The association with ball courts is also reflected in the Popol Vuh, the famous religious, mythological and cultural account of the K'iche' Maya. When Hun Hunahpu, father of the Maya Hero Twins, was killed by the lords of the Underworld (Xibalba), his head was hung in a gourd tree next to a ball court.

Gallery

Contemporary uses 
 have been the subject of multiple artworks created during the twentieth century. Jose Chavez Morado depicted  in a 1961 painting. The  featured an exhibit titled , which featured works made by various artists depicting skulls.

See also

 Skull Chapel, Czermna
 Santa Maria della Concezione dei Cappuccini
 Sedlec Ossuary
 Capela dos Ossos
 Skull Tower
 Headhunting
 Tzompantli band

References

Bibliography 
 
 
 
 
 
 

 
 
 
 
 
 
 

Aztec society
Human head and neck
Human trophy collecting
Maya society
Mesoamerican warfare
Mesoamerica
Cannibalism in North America